Bayou Meto (also Bayou Metoe) is an unincorporated community in Arkansas County, Arkansas, United States. The community is located where Arkansas Highway 276S diverges from Arkansas Highway 276.

Residents are in the DeWitt School District. It operates DeWitt High School.

References

Unincorporated communities in Arkansas County, Arkansas
Unincorporated communities in Arkansas
Arkansas placenames of Native American origin

es:Bayou Meto (condado de Lonoke, Arkansas)